The 1960 Houston Cougars football team was an American football team that represented the University of Houston as an independent during the 1960 NCAA University Division football season. In its fourth season under head coach Hal Lahar, the team compiled a 6–4 record. Wiley Feagin, Jim Kuehne, and Jim Windham were the team captains. The team played its home games at Rice Stadium in Houston.

Schedule

References

Houston
Houston Cougars football seasons
Houston Cougars football